Farnsworth is a Census Designated Place in western Ochiltree County, Texas, United States.  It lies at the intersection of State Highway 15 with FM376, southwest of the city of Perryton, the county seat of Ochiltree County.  Its elevation is 2,995 feet (913 m).  Although Farnsworth is unincorporated, it has a post office, with the ZIP code of 79033; the ZCTA for ZIP code 79033 had a population of 106 at the 2000 census.

Founded in 1919 along the Panhandle and Santa Fe Railway, Farnsworth was not the first community in the area: the coming of ranchers in the 1880s had led to the establishment of a nearby community named Olds.  The locality changed names several times: starting at Olds, it became Nogal with the establishment of a post office in 1905, changed to Rogerstown in 1906, and finally concluded in 1920 with the opening of a post office at the current site.  From the beginning, the community has borne the name of Farnsworth, given in honor of Panhandle and Santa Fe Railway director H. W. Farnsworth

Climate
According to the Köppen Climate Classification system, Farnsworth has a semi-arid climate, abbreviated "BSk" on climate maps.

References

External links
Community profile from the Handbook of Texas Online

Unincorporated communities in Ochiltree County, Texas
Unincorporated communities in Texas